The Chin Students' Association (CSA) is the student body of the Zomi people living in the country of India. It is one of the main bodies of the TCU or Tedim Chin Union.

There is also another body known as the CYA, or Chin Youth Association. It is the youth organ of the Chin. It works for the development and upliftment of the Chin people. There is also a Tedim Chin Cultural Club (TCCC) Hall at Lanva in the Churandpur District of Manipur, India. The Chin Student Association plays an important role in the student activities of the Chin.

See Also
 Akhil Bharatiya Vidyarthi Parishad

External links
Vaphual Zomi news is a news blog run by the Chin Students Association in New Delhi called Vaphual.net. It covers news from and about northeast India, Burma and Zomi all over the world. This site attracts readers from all over the world with more than 15,000 views per month.
Vaphual news blog collects articles on Zomi history, culture, and folklores of the Zomi people.

Student societies in India